Gymnocalycium spegazzinii is a species of Gymnocalycium from Argentina and Bolivia named after the botanist C. L. Spegazzini.

References

External links
 
 

spegazzinii
Flora of Argentina
Plants described in 1922